Mark Konstantinovich Azadovsky (18 December 1888 in Irkutsk – 24 November 1954 in Leningrad) was a Soviet scholar of folk-tales and Russian literature. As the head of the Folklore department at Leningrad State University during Stalin's anticosmopolitan campaigns of 1948-1953, he was denounced and fired along with Boris Eikhenbaum, Viktor Zhirmunsky, and Grigory Gukovsky. Their scholarly work was expunged from literary journals and their names erased from all indices, footnotes, and bibliographies. After his expulsion from Leningrad State University, Azadovsky began to suffer heart trouble, complications of which led to his death in 1954.

References

1888 births
1954 deaths
Writers from Irkutsk
People from Irkutsk Governorate
Academic staff of Tomsk State University
Recipients of the Order of the Red Banner of Labour
Ethnographers from the Russian Empire
Soviet ethnographers
Soviet folklorists
Soviet literary historians
Soviet male writers